Trayon Denzil Bobb (born 5 November 1993) is a Guyanese professional footballer who plays as a left-winger for S.U.1 de Dezembro of the Portuguese  Campeonato de Portugal league. He also represents the Guyana national team.

Bobb began his professional football career with Caledonia AIA of the TT Pro League in Trinidad and Tobago in 2011. During his time with the Stallions, Bobb won the FA Trophy in 2011–12 and the CFU Club Championship in 2012. In the middle of his second season with Caledonia AIA, in 2013, Bobb moved to Finland to join TP-47 before moving to RoPS Rovaniemi on a joint-loan agreement. In August 2013, Bobb was loaned to Lithuanian club FK Kruoja for the 2013 and 2014 A Lyga seasons.

He is a Guyana international having made his debut in August 2011.

Early life
Bobb was born in nearby village Uitvlugt of Essequibo Islands-West Demerara, Guyana, which is located on west bank of the Demerara River. Trayon is the younger brother of former Guyana national team defender Orville Bobb Carroll. Bobb began his competitive football career, at the age of 16, for West Demerara during the Guyana Football Federation under-17 inter-association tournament. On 27 March 2010, Bobb dominated a match against East Bank netting four goals, which included a first-half hat-trick. Two months later, West Demerara defeated Georgetown 2–1 in the final of the tournament to claim the title. After scoring seven goals in the competition and finishing as the joint-top goal scorer, Bobb was named the most valuable player of the tournament.

Club career

Caledonia AIA
Following a series of impressive performances during the Kashif & Shanghai knockout competition in 2010, Trayon followed Guyana national team manager Jamaal Shabazz to Trinidad and Tobago to begin his professional football career for Caledonia AIA of the TT Pro League. Bobb made his debut for the Stallions of Morvant/Laventille during the club's early elimination from the 2011 CFU Club Championship after just four matches. In his first professional season with Caledonia AIA, Bobb made seven league appearances for the club. However, he featured brightly during the club's First Citizens Cup, Lucozade Sport Goal Shield, FA Trophy, Kashif & Shanghai, and CFU Club Championship successes.

Bobb opened the 2012–13 season for Caledonia AIA as a starter in the Stallions''' midfield. During the 2012–13 CONCACAF Champions League, he made two appearances for Caledonia during the group stage, including a start against Seattle Sounders FC of Major League Soccer on 2 August. In October 2012, Bobb was named the most valuable player of the First Citizens Cup after having set-up and scoring the winning goal to lead Caledonia AIA to a 2–1 win over Defence Force in the final. The following months, Bobb scored in consecutive rounds during the TOYOTA Classic and provided an additional two goals in an 8–0 win over Petit Valley United in the FA Trophy. On 8 January 2013, Trayon was one of five TT Pro League players invited for a two-week trial with a touring team in Turkey to play practice matches against several European clubs on their winter breaks. Before departing for Turkey, Bobb had made ten league appearances for Caledonia AIA in his two years with the club.

Tornion Pallo-47
On 21 February 2013, Bobb agreed to personal terms with TP-47 of Kakkonen, the third-level of association football in Finland. On 13 March, Bobb recorded his first career hat-trick in his debut for TP-47 during the third round of the 2013 Suomen Cup. He went on to make starting appearances the following two rounds before a defeat to TPV ended the Tornio club's run in the fifth round. Bobb recorded his first league goal in his debut for TP-47, on 28 April, to level the match against PK-37 at 2–2 in the 85th minute after scoring from a cross. A week later, Trayon scored his second goal in as many matches in a 2–0 win over Vasa IFK. He scored two more goals over the next five league matches against Tervarit on 19 May and a week later against KPV on 26 May.

Loans to RoPS and FK Kruoja (2013–2014)
On 1 June, after scoring four goals in seven league appearances for TP-47, Bobb joined Veikkausliiga side RoPS on loan with the agreement to permit Trayon to compete for both clubs during the loan. The following day, Bobb became the first Guyanese to play in a Veikkausliiga match when he made his debut against FF Jaro coming on as a substitute for former Caledonia AIA teammate Ataullah Guerra in the 59th minute. Before returning to TP-47, Bobb made three Veikkausliiga appearances for RoPS. He made his return on 16 June and scored a goal for the Tornio club in a win over GBK Kokkola. Bobb scored again on 21 July with the opening goal during the return match against KPV, which marked his sixth goal in 12 league appearances with TP-47.

On 23 July 2013, Bobb traveled to Lithuania for a one-week trial with FK Kruoja of A Lyga. After a strong performance in an exhibition match and a medical examination, he secured a loan until the end of the 2013 season. Although Bobb had not made an appearance for the club, TP-47 and Kruoja agreed to extend his loan until the end of the 2014 A Lyga season.

Bobb opened the following season with an ankle injury suffered during preseason training that kept him sidelined for FK Kruoja's first eleven league matches. On 8 May 2014, Bobb scored an 84th-minute goal in his debut for Kruoja during a league match against FK Dainava Alytus after coming as a substitute in the 66th minute.

International career
Bobb has represented Guyana on various levels of international competition, having been capped for the under-20 and the Guyana national teams. Considered to be the future of Guyanese football, Bobb has quickly improved since his national team debut and has become a permanent fixture in the senior team.

Youth teams
He began his international career for the under-20 team during qualification for the 2011 CONCACAF U-20 Championship, where Bobb made three appearances playing as a winger in wins over United States Virgin Islands and Grenada; and a loss to Jamaica. In the second qualification round, Bobb scored his first goal for Guyana in the 81st minute against Netherlands Antilles, which resulted in the Golden Jaguars lone win in the group on 23 January 2011. Prior to elimination, Bobb made six consecutive starts for Guyana during the team's qualification attempt.

In August 2012, Bobb made two additional appearances for the under-20 team during its qualification attempt for the 2013 CONCACAF U-20 Championship. Guyana finished a disappointing third in its group behind neighbors Suriname and Trinidad and Tobago, which eliminated the Golden Jaguars from the competition. However, in the team's first match against Trinidad and Tobago, Bobb scored Guyana's lone goal in an eventual 2–1 loss.

Senior team

Bobb made his full international debut for the national team on 25 August 2011, at the age of 18, in a friendly match against India. After impressing in the match, Trayon earned his second cap against Barbados a week later in a 2014 FIFA World Cup qualifier. Bobb continued his solid performances in a series of seven international matches in preparation for the third round of World Cup qualification. On 7 September 2013, Bobb scored a pair of goals on either side of half-time to earn the Golden Jaguars a 2–2 draw against El Salvador in Estadio Cuscatlán. However, the draw would prove to be the lone point for Guyana during the third round. Before elimination, Bobb recorded a total of five caps and scored two goals during Guyana's qualification campaign. Bobb concluded an active year for the Golden Jaguars with six consecutive starts during Guyana's  qualification attempt for the 2012 Caribbean Cup in October and November.

Career statistics

ClubAs of 22 June 2014InternationalAs of 18 November 2019International appearances

International goalsScores and results list Guyana's goal tally first.''

Honours

Club
 Caledonia AIA
 CFU Club Championship (1): 2012
 FA Trophy (1): 2011–12
 First Citizens Cup (2): 2011, 2012
 Lucozade Sport Goal Shield (1): 2012

Individual

Awards
 Man of the Match (1): 2012 First Citizens Cup

References

External links
 
 
 
 

1993 births
Living people
Association football midfielders
Guyanese footballers
Guyana international footballers
TT Pro League players
Morvant Caledonia United players
Veikkausliiga players
Kakkonen players
A Lyga players
Expatriate footballers in Trinidad and Tobago
Expatriate footballers in Finland
Expatriate footballers in Lithuania
People from Essequibo Islands-West Demerara
TP-47 players
Guyana youth international footballers